William Barr Borland (21 August 1888 – 25 September 1915) was a Scottish professional footballer who played as a centre half in the Football League for Fulham.

Personal life 
Borland enlisted in the British Army in October 1914, during the First World War. He served as a private in the Queen's Own Cameron Highlanders and was killed on the opening day of the Battle of Loos on 25 September 1915. He is commemorated on the Loos Memorial.

Career statistics

References

1888 births
1915 deaths
Footballers from East Ayrshire
Scottish footballers
Association football wing halves
Darvel F.C. players
Fulham F.C. players
English Football League players
British Army personnel of World War I
British military personnel killed in World War I
Queen's Own Cameron Highlanders soldiers
Galston F.C. players